Ringen is a former Verbandsgemeinde ("collective municipality") in the district of Ahrweiler, in Rhineland-Palatinate, Germany. The seat of the municipality was in Ringen. It existed from 1 October 1968 until 16 March 1974, when the new municipality Grafschaft was formed.

The Verbandsgemeinde Ringen consisted of the following 12 Ortsgemeinden ("local municipalities") (population as of 1974):

* seat of the Verbandsgemeinde

References

Former Verbandsgemeinden in Rhineland-Palatinate